Terry Black was a Canadian football player who played for the Ottawa Rough Riders. He won the Grey Cup with them in 1969. He previously played junior football with the Ottawa Sooners who played in the 1968 Little Grey Cup in Edmonton, Alberta.

References

1947 births
Living people
Canadian football running backs
Ottawa Rough Riders players
Players of Canadian football from Ontario
Sportspeople from Barrie